Nicole de Savigny (1535–1590) was a French noblewoman. She was a mistress to Henry II of France in 1556–57.

De Savigny was the daughter of Georges II of Savigny and his first wife, Nicole d'Haussonville. She had a child with the king, Henry de Saint-Rémy (1557−1621).

References

Sources

1535 births
1590 deaths
16th-century French people
16th-century French women
Mistresses of Henry II of France